Byrne Construction Services (Thos. S. Byrne, Inc.) is a Fort Worth, Texas based construction company providing construction manager and general contractor services.  In addition to its Fort Worth headquarters, Byrne has a full service office in San Antonio.

History
Byrne was founded in Fort Worth in 1923 by Thomas Sneed Byrne, a native Texan and a 1913 graduate of the Massachusetts Institute of Technology.  Byrne completed its first major contract, the Montgomery Ward's Building in Fort Worth, in 1928.  Byrne also completed the renovation of the Montgomery Ward's Building into the Montgomery Plaza Condominiums in 2009.

Byrne also served as the General Contractor for Louis Kahn's Kimbell Art Museum.  The Kimbell Art Museum won the first Build America Award from the Associated General Contractors of America in 1972 for the "innovative construction techniques" used on the museum and the American Institute of Architects 25 Year Award.

Byrne is now in its third generation of management under the direction of John Avila, Jr., Chairman.

Notable Projects
Kimbell Art Museum: Fort Worth, Texas
Bob Bullock Texas State History Museum: Austin, Texas
Montgomery Plaza: Fort Worth, Texas
Old Red Courthouse: Dallas, Texas
Latino Cultural Center: Dallas, Texas
Rachofsky House: Dallas, Texas
Ellis County Courthouse: Waxahachie, Texas
Amon Carter Museum: Fort Worth, Texas
Plaza Theatre: El Paso, Texas
Booker T. Washington High School for the Performing and Visual Arts: Dallas, Texas
American Airlines C.R. Smith Museum: Fort Worth, Texas

References

External links
Byrne Official Website
BM Concrete Construction

Construction and civil engineering companies of the United States
Companies based in Fort Worth, Texas